The 2016–17 UCLA Bruins women's basketball team represented the University of California, Los Angeles during the 2016–17 NCAA Division I women's basketball season. The Bruins, led by sixth year head coach Cori Close, play their home games at the Pauley Pavilion and were members of the Pac-12 Conference. They finished the season 25–9, 13–5 in Pac-12 play to finish in fourth place. They advanced to the semifinals of the Pac-12 women's tournament where they lost to Oregon State. They received an at-large bid to the NCAA women's tournament where they defeated Boise State and Texas A&M in the first and second rounds before losing to UConn in the Sweet Sixteen.

Offseason

Departures

Incoming transfers

2016 recruiting class

Roster

Rankings

Schedule

|-
!colspan=9 style="background:#0073CF; color:gold;"| Exhibition

|-
!colspan=9 style="background:#0073CF; color:gold;"| Non-conference regular season

|-
!colspan=9 style="background:#0073CF; color:gold;"| Pac-12 regular season

|-
!colspan=9 style="background:#0073CF;"| Pac-12 Women's Tournament

|-
!colspan=9 style="background:#0073CF;"| NCAA Women's Tournament

Honors
Nov. 21 – Jordin Canada named Pac-12 Conference Player-of-the-week

See also
 2016–17 UCLA Bruins men's basketball team

References

UCLA
UCLA Bruins women's basketball
UCLA